The 2016–17 Northern Counties East Football League season was the 35th in the history of Northern Counties East Football League, a football competition in England.

Club allocations was approved 12 May 2016.

Premier Division

The Premier Division featured 18 clubs which competed in the previous season, along with four new clubs.
Clubs promoted from Division One:
AFC Mansfield
Bottesford Town
Hemsworth Miners Welfare
Plus:
Harrogate Railway Athletic, relegated from the Northern Premier League

League table

Stadia and locations

Division One

Division One featured 17 clubs which competed in the previous season, along with five new clubs.
Clubs relegated from the Premier Division:
Brigg Town
Nostell Miners Welfare
Pontefract Collieries
Plus:
Campion – promoted from the West Riding County Amateur Football League
Ollerton Town – promoted from the Central Midlands League

League table

Play-offs

Semi-finals

Final

Stadia and locations

League Cup

The 2016–17 Northern Counties East Football League Cup was the 35th season of the league cup competition of the Northern Counties East Football League.

First round

Second round

Third round

Fourth round

Quarter-finals

Semi-finals

Final

References

External links
 Northern Counties East Football League

2016-17
9